Abacetus atratus is a species of ground beetle in the subfamily Pterostichinae. It was described by Dejean in 1828 and is found in India and Sri Lanka.

References

atratus
Beetles described in 1828
Insects of India
Insects of Sri Lanka